Usman Nurmagomedov (born April 17, 1998), is a Russian mixed martial artist currently competing in the Lightweight division of Bellator MMA, where he is the current Bellator Lightweight World Champion. He has previously competed in the UAE Warriors and Eagle Fighting Championship (then Gorilla Fighting Championship). He is the younger brother of UFC fighter Umar Nurmagomedov and a cousin of former UFC Lightweight Champion Khabib Nurmagomedov. As of March 14, 2023, he is #5 in the Bellator men's pound-for-pound rankings.

Background 
Usman Nurmagomedov was born on April 17, 1998, in the city of Kizilyurt, Republic of Dagestan.

As a child, living in his native village, with his brother Umar Nurmagomedov, he began to attend freestyle wrestling practice at the age of eight. Once his brother Umar began to practice Thai boxing, Usman followed suit.

After moving to Makhachkala, Usman began training with his uncle, Abdulmanap Nurmagomedov at the Eagles MMA camp. There he gained sambo skills and trained alongside teammates such as his cousin Khabib Nurmagomedov and Islam Makhachev. He is of Avar ethnic origin.

Mixed martial arts career

Early career 
Nurmagomedov's professional MMA career began on March 26, 2017 in Moscow at the Moscow Pankration Federation promotion tournament. His opponent was Imran Abdiev. Usman won his first professional fight via armbar in the first round.

Nurmagomedov would continue fighting in various organizations such as the GFC and UAE Warriors, winning his next 10 fights. All but one of these fights were won by a knockout or submission. After winning his 11th professional fight in the Abdulmanap Nurmagomedov Memory Tournament, Usman signed a multi-fight contract with Bellator. According to MMA journalist Ariel Helwani, he is considered to be a "major prospect" in the sport.

Bellator MMA 
In his stateside and Bellator debut on April 2, 2021 at Bellator 255, Nurmagomedov fought Mike Hamel. Primarily utilizing his significant reach advantage, Usman focused on throwing kicks and not letting Hamel get into range. At times when Hamel did close the distance, Nurmagomedov took the fight to the ground. He won the fight via Unanimous Decision.

In his second fight for Bellator on July 31, 2021 at Bellator 263, Nurmagomedov faced Luis "Manny" Muro. After landing a successful knee that caused Muro to fall to the floor, Nurmagomedov followed through with hammerfists causing the referee to stop the fight in round 1.

Usman's next fight was at Bellator 269 on October 23, 2021 where he faced Patrik Pietilä at a catchweight bout at 160 lbs. After utilizing his kicks from a distance, Nurmagomedov took the fight to the ground once Pietila closed the distance. Taking his back, Nurmagomedov locked in a rear-naked choke, and won the fight by submission in the first round.

Nurmagomedov then faced Chris Gonzalez on July 22, 2022 at Bellator 283. After tripping Gonzalez, Usman locked in a guillotine choke and got the tap. He won the fight via Submission in the first round.

Usman faced Patricky Pitbull for the Bellator Lightweight World Championship at Bellator 288 on November 18, 2022. He defeated him in dominant fashion, winning the belt and the bout via unanimous decision.

Lightweight Grand Prix 
Nurmagomedov was announced as one of the participants of the Bellator Lightweight Grand Prix, which has a grand prize of $1 million. On March 10, 2023, Usman defended his title in the quarterfinal of the Grand Prix against former WEC and UFC Lightweight Champion Benson Henderson at Bellator 292. He won the fight quickly, dropping Henderson with a question-mark kick seconds into the fight, and then proceeding to take his back and win the fight with a rear-naked choke.

Championships and awards
Bellator MMA
Bellator Lightweight World Championship (One time; current)
One successful title defense

Mixed martial arts record 

|-
|Win
|align=center|17–0
|Benson Henderson
|Submission (rear-naked choke)
|Bellator 292
|
|align=center|1
|align=center|2:37
|San Jose, California, United States
|
|-
|Win
|align=center|16–0
|Patricky Pitbull
|Decision (unanimous)
|Bellator 288
|
|align=center|5
|align=center|5:00
|Chicago, Illinois, United States
|
|-
|Win
|align=center|15–0
|Chris Gonzalez
|Submission (guillotine choke)
|Bellator 283
|
|align=center|1
|align=center|2:54
|Tacoma, Washington, United States
|
|-
|Win
|align=center|14–0
|Patrik Pietilä
|Submission (rear-naked choke)
|Bellator 269
|
|align=center|1
|align=center|4:06
|Moscow, Russia
|
|-
|Win
|align=center|13–0
|Manny Muro
|TKO (knee to the body)
|Bellator 263
|
|align=center|1
|align=center|3:30
|Inglewood, California, United States
|
|-
|Win
|align=center|12–0
|Mike Hamel
|Decision (unanimous)
|Bellator 255
|
|align=center|3
|align=center|5:00
|Uncasville, Connecticut, United States
|
|-
|Win
|align=center|11–0
|Svyatoslav Shabanov
|TKO (punches)
|FNG / GFC: Abdulmanap Nurmagomedov Memory Tournament
|
|align=center|2
|align=center|3:37
|Moscow, Russia
|
|-
|Win
|align=center|10–0
|Jerry Kvarnstrom
|TKO (punches and elbows)
|UAE Warriors 12
|
|align=center|1
|align=center|2:39
|Abu Dhabi, United Arab Emirates
|
|-
|Win
|align=center|9–0
|Ruslan Tuyakov
|TKO (knees)
|Gorilla Fighting 24
|
|align=center|2
|align=center|2:03
|Saratov, Russia
|
|-
|Win
|align=center|8–0
|Roman Golovinov
|TKO (punches)
|UAE Warriors 9
|
|align=center|1
|align=center|1:45
|Abu Dhabi, United Arab Emirates
|
|-
|Win
|align=center|7–0
|Kazim Zhakhangirov
|Submission (guillotine choke)
|Gorilla Fighting 17
|
|align=center|2
|align=center|1:10
|Atyrau, Kazakhstan
|
|-
|Win
|align=center|6–0
|Ruslan Hisamutdinov
|Decision (unanimous)
|Gorilla Fighting 15
|
|align=center|3
|align=center|5:00
|Penza, Russia
|
|-
|Win
|align=center|5–0
|Gabriel Baino
|TKO (punches)
|Gorilla Fighting 11
|
|align=center|1
|align=center|3:14
|Penza, Russia
|
|-
|Win
|align=center|4–0
|Romeo Njia
|Submission (rear-naked choke)
|Battle on Volga 9
|
|align=center|1
|align=center|4:48
|Moscow, Russia
|
|-
|Win
|align=center|3–0
|Issei Moriyama
|TKO (punches)
|Brave CF 21
|
|align=center|1
|align=center|N/A
|Jeddah, Saudi Arabia
|
|-
|Win
|align=center|2–0
|Dmitriy Berestovskiy
| (doctor stoppage)
|Battle on Volga 8
|
|align=center|1
|align=center|5:00
|Samara, Russia
|
|-
|Win
|align=center|1–0
|Imran Abdiev
|Submission (armbar)
|MPF: Young Talents Cup 2017
|
|align=center|1
|align=center|1:51
|Moscow, Russia
|

See also 

 List of current Bellator fighters
 List of male mixed martial artists
 List of undefeated mixed martial artists

References

External links 
  
 

1998 births
Nurmagomedov family
Dagestani mixed martial artists
Lightweight mixed martial artists
Mixed martial artists utilizing sambo
Mixed martial artists utilizing Muay Thai
Bellator male fighters
Living people
People from Kizilyurt
Russian male mixed martial artists
Russian Muay Thai practitioners
Russian sambo practitioners